Ágnes Szentannai (born 10 January 1994 in Budapest) is a Hungarian female curler.

On international level she is bronze medallist of 2013 European Mixed Curling Championship.

On national level she is one-time Hungarian women's curling champion (2021), six-time Hungarian mixed curling champion (2012, 2013, 2014, 2015, 2016, 2018), two-time Hungarian junior women's curling champion (2012, 2013).

Teams and events

Women's

Mixed

References

External links
 

1994 births
Living people
Hungarian female curlers
Hungarian curling champions
Sportspeople from Budapest